Ralph Trenewith may refer to:

Ralph Trenewith (died 1393), MP for Truro
Ralph Trenewith (died 1427), MP for Liskeard

See also
Trenewith (surname)